Goeldiella eques is a species of three-barbeled catfish that occurs in the Guianas and the Amazon basin of Brazil, Peru and Venezuela.  This fish reaches a length of  SL. It is the only species of its genus.

References

Heptapteridae
Monotypic fish genera
Catfish of South America
Freshwater fish of Brazil
Fish of French Guiana
Fish of Guyana
Freshwater fish of Peru
Fish of Suriname
Fish of Venezuela
Fish of the Amazon basin
Fish described in 1849
Monotypic freshwater fish genera
Catfish genera
Taxa named by Carl H. Eigenmann